Joshua Johnson (born March 22, 1980) is an American journalist. He is the former host of 1A, which is produced by WAMU and nationally distributed by NPR. In 2019, he joined MSNBC and hosted The Week with Joshua Johnson; he later hosted Now Tonight with Joshua Johnson on NBC News Now.

Early life 

Johnson was born and raised in West Palm Beach, Florida, the only son of a public school teacher and Vietnam veteran. He became interested in journalism as a child, inspired by African American journalists such as Ed Bradley, Bernard Shaw, and Dwight Lauderdale.

Career 

Johnson graduated from the University of Miami and began his career in public radio working for a collaborative project between WLRN and the Miami Herald, from 2004 to 2010.

In 2010, Johnson relocated to San Francisco to work for KQED, an NPR affiliate, where he served as morning newscaster until early 2016. In 2016, he hosted the radio series Truth Be Told, produced by KQED and distributed by Public Radio International. Truth Be Told dealt with issues of race in America, and four episodes were broadcast nationally. He was also a substitute host of KQED's Forum and taught courses in podcasting at the UC Berkeley Graduate School of Journalism. In September 2016, he guest hosted The Diane Rehm Show for two days, and in November, Rehm announced Johnson would be taking over her time slot.

Johnson served as the host of 1A, which was distributed by NPR, from 2017 through 2019. In late 2019, he announced that he would be leaving 1A on December 20 to become an anchor for MSNBC in 2020.

In November 2022 Johnson left Now Tonight on NBC News Now.

Personal life 

Johnson declines to discuss his own personal opinions, and says he has been called both conservative and liberal.

Johnson is a member of the National Association of Black Journalists, and The National Lesbian and Gay Journalists Association.

References

External links
Joshua Johnson on NPR

American talk radio hosts
American radio journalists
Living people
African-American journalists
American LGBT journalists
LGBT African Americans
LGBT people from Florida
American male journalists
People from West Palm Beach, Florida
University of Miami alumni
NPR personalities
African-American radio personalities
Journalists from Florida
21st-century American journalists
American LGBT broadcasters
Radio personalities from San Francisco
Radio personalities from Florida
1980 births
21st-century African-American people
20th-century African-American people